The Bozo are a Mande ethnic group located predominantly along the Niger River in Mali. The name Bozo is thought to derive from Bambara  bo-so "straw house"; the people accept it as referring to the whole of the ethnic group but use more specific clan names such as Sorogoye, Hain, and Tieye themselves. They are famous for their fishing and are occasionally referred to as the "masters of the river".

The Bozo language, which belongs to the Soninke-Bozo subgroup of Northwestern Mande, have traditionally been considered dialects of one language though there are at least four distinct varieties.

Aspects of Bozo culture took shape under the 10th century Ghana Empire, when the Bozo took possession of the banks of the Niger. The Bozo were the founders of the Malian cities of Djenné and Mopti.

Though the Bozo are predominantly Muslim, they preserve a number of animist traditions as well. Their animal totem is the bull, whose body represents the Niger and whose horns represent the Bozo fishing pirogues.

A 2000 census counted the Bozo population of Mali to be 132,100.

Bibliography
 
 in : Geo Special Westafrika, Article: Sexualkunde am Fluss

References

External links

Ethnic groups in Mali
Muslim communities in Africa
Mandé people
West African people